Fred J. Moser (May 2, 1898 – August 23 1993) was an American politician and educator.

Born in Plum City, Wisconsin, Moser served in the United States Army during World War I. He graduated from University of Wisconsin–Madison. He was a school administrator, guidance counselor, and teacher in Cumberland, Wisconsin. He served on the Cumberland Common Council and the county school committee. Moser served in the Wisconsin State Assembly in 1965 and was a Democrat.

Notes

1898 births
1993 deaths
People from Cumberland, Wisconsin
People from Pierce County, Wisconsin
Military personnel from Wisconsin
University of Wisconsin–Madison alumni
Educators from Wisconsin
Wisconsin city council members
School board members in Wisconsin
20th-century American politicians
Democratic Party members of the Wisconsin State Assembly